The Caproni Ca.127 was a single-engine reconnaissance monoplane built by Caproni in the mid-1930s.

Design
The Ca.127 was a single engine for distant reconnaissance; it was built with a metal structure and a fuselage, with a rectangular section, built in welded steel tubes covered in canvas. The empennages are single-celled, made of steel tube covered with painted canvas. The drift and fixed altitude plan were adjustable in flight. The partially cantilever wings rested each to a metal strut that anchored to a knot in the fuselage; they were built in a light-alloy metal structure of the monospar type covered in cloth.
 
The landing gear was of the double axle type; the shock absorber was connected to the side member of the wing at the stiffening strut of the same. The wheels were equipped with aerodynamic fairings and used medium pressure tires with expanding brakes. The tail pad was sprung, with a swiveling wheel.

The cabin was dual-controlled, with side-by-side seats, and the glazed hood was connected to the rear with the median section of the wing. In the cockpit there was a telegraphic transceiver, a camera, and a front-firing machine gun.

Based on results of flight tests, the Ca.127 was judged unfit to perform its intended role and did not enter production.

Specifications

References

Ca.127